The 1999 season was the Chicago Bears' 80th in the National Football League (NFL). On January 24, Dick Jauron was named head coach. The team improved on their 4–12 from 1998, finishing with a 6–10 under Jauron, who replaced Dave Wannstedt.

Quarterbacks Shane Matthews (1,645), Cade McNown (1,465) and Jim Miller (1,242) combined for 4,352 passing yards during the season, the most in franchise history.

Offseason

Organizational changes 
Head coach Dave Wannstedt was fired after the 1998 season, forcing the Bears to hire their second head coach in ten years. The candidates included offensive coordinators Sherman Lewis of the Green Bay Packers and Joe Pendry of the Buffalo Bills, defensive coordinators Dave McGinnis (Arizona Cardinals), Dick Jauron (Jacksonville Jaguars) and Gunther Cunningham (Kansas City Chiefs), while DC Jim Haslett (Pittsburgh Steelers) was interviewed. Minnesota Vikings OC Brian Billick and New York Jets DC Bill Belichick were also allowed to be interviewed by the team. McGinnis was considered the favorite, and was interviewed last; he would be approached by Bears president Michael McCaskey for contractual terms, with McGinnis stating he "needed some time and he would think about it." However, the next day, McCaskey scheduled a press conference to announce McGinnis as the head coach, despite not having been officially hired. As a result, the conference was canceled, and Jauron would instead be hired, while McCaskey would be replaced by Ted Phillips.

NFL draft

Staff

Roster

Regular season

Schedule

Standings

References

External links 

 1999 Chicago Bears at Pro-Football-Reference.com

Chicago Bears
Chicago Bears seasons
Chicago Bears
1990s in Chicago
1999 in Illinois